Stephan Hörner (born 1958) is a German musicologist and board member of the .

Hörner is editor of several editions in the series  as well as of study volumes and conference reports. He has also edited various scores.

Together with Bernhold Schmid, Hörner published the Festschrift für Horst Leuchtmann zum 65. Geburtstag (at Hans Schneider), Tutzing 1993).

Publications 
Books
 Josef Rheinberger; Tutzing : Schneider, 2005
 Franz Lachner und seine Brüder; Tutzing : Schneider, 2006
 Abt  OSB (1705–1755) und die Musikpflege in St. Mang's Abbey, Füssen; Tutzing : Schneider, 2007
 Das Musikleben am Hof von Duke Maximilian Emanuel in Bavaria; Tutzing : Schneider, 2012

Notes
 Mozart: Concerto for Piano and Orchestra G major KV 453 [music print]. Wiesbaden: Breitkopf and Härtel; Munich: G. Henle, 2008, [voices].
 Mozart concerto for piano and orchestra G major [music print]; Wiesbaden - Breitkopf & Härtel; Munich: G. Henle, 2008, score
 Mozart piano concerto G major KV 453 [music print] - Munich : G. Henle, c 2006, Urtext
 Mozart: Concerto for Piano and Orchestra G major [music print] - Wiesbaden. Breitkopf and Härtel; Munich: G. Henle, [2013?]
 Symphonic poems by composers of the "Munich School" [music print] - Wiesbaden: Breitkopf und Härtel, 2005, [score]
 Monuments of the Art of Music in Bavaria / N.F. / Vol. 11th Selected Symphonies from the Munich Period c 1996, [score]

References 

20th-century German musicologists
21st-century German musicologists
1958 births
Living people
Place of birth missing (living people)